Bruce William Neill (born 23 February 1949 in Cabramatta, New South Wales) was an Australian cricket player, who played for the Tasmanian Tigers. He was a right-handed batsman who only represented the team briefly in the 1977–78 season.

See also
 List of Tasmanian representative cricketers

External links
Cricinfo Profile

1949 births
Living people
Australian cricketers
Tasmania cricketers
International Cavaliers cricketers
Cricketers from Sydney